3,4-Dimethoxycinnamic acid is a cinnamic acid derivative isolated from coffee beans.

References

Carboxylic acids
O-methylated phenylpropanoids